Ian Williams (born August 31, 1970) is an American rock guitarist and singer-songwriter. He became noted for his finger tapping guitar playing in bands such as Don Caballero, Storm & Stress and currently in Battles. He is known for his one-handed guitar playing technique, often while playing keyboards or Ableton Push simultaneously with the other hand.

Biography
Williams was born in Pittsburgh, Pennsylvania, and spent part of his childhood in Malawi, before returning to the US in the 6th grade.

He graduated from the University of Pittsburgh in Pittsburgh, where he studied history and political science.

Musical career
In his teenage years Williams was a drummer and vocalist for Pittsburgh-based band 'Sludgehammer'.

Williams joined Pittsburgh math rock pioneers Don Caballero as a second guitarist in  1992 until 2000.  He had also played in the Chicago-based, avant-garde band Storm & Stress from 1997 to 2000. Williams moved to New York City in the early 2000s and formed Battles in 2002.

Williams is well known for his approach to finger tapping on guitar and uses Gibson's Echoplex looping system. His propensity towards guitar tapping allows him to accompany himself on keyboard at live performances, using one hand for each instrument.

Williams made a short cameo appearance in the 2000 film High Fidelity as a customer in the music store (shortly after John Cusack's character  announces, "I will now sell five copies of The Three E.P.'s by The Beta Band."). He also had small cameos in Heaven's a Drag and Bloodmoon, a 1997 martial arts action film.

Setup

(Battles: 2004 - 2010)
Guitars
 Gibson Les Paul Studio

Keyboards
 M-Audio ProKeys Sono 88

Software
 Native Instruments Kontakt 4

Computers
 Apple Mac

Rack Mount Units
 Gibson Echoplex Digital Pro - w/Footswitch

Amplifiers
 Roland JC-120
 Ampeg SVT VR Head
 Marshall 4x12 Cabinet

(Battles: 2011 - Present)
Guitars
 Gibson Les Paul 
 Gibson SG

Keyboards
 M-Audio Axiom 61 - X 2 (2011 - 2013)
 Novation 61 SL MkII (2014 - 2016)
 M-Audio Keystation 61 II (2014–Present)

Software
 Native Instruments Kontakt 5
 Ableton Live
 Mainstage (Software) (2011 - 2013)

Sequencer
 Akai APC40 (2011 - 2013)
 Ableton Push (2014–Present)

Computers
 Apple Mac - X 2 (2011 - 2013)
 Apple Mac - X 1 (2014–Present)
 Apogee Duet

Rack Mount Units
 Gibson Echoplex Digital Pro - w/Footswitch (2011 - 2013)

MIDI Footswitches
 Roland FC-300 (2011 - 2013)
 Keith McMillen SoftStep 2 (2014–Present)

Amplifiers
 Roland JC-120
 Ampeg SVT-VR Head
 Ampeg SVT-CL Head
 Ampeg 6x12 Cabinet
 Marshall 4x12 Cabinet

Discography

As a band member 

 Don Caballero - For Respect (1993)
 Don Caballero - Don Caballero 2 (1995)
 Don Caballero - What Burns Never Returns (1998)
 Don Caballero - Singles Breaking Up (Vol. 1) (1999)
 Don Caballero - American Don (2000)
 Storm & Stress - Storm and Stress (1997)
 Storm & Stress - Under Thunder & Fluorescent Lights (2000)
 Battles — EP C / B EP (2006)
 Battles — Mirrored (2007)
 Battles — Gloss Drop (2011)
 Battles – La Di Da Di (2015)
 Battles - Juice B Crypts (2019)

References

External links
 

1970 births
Living people
American rock guitarists
American male guitarists
People from Johnstown, Pennsylvania
Guitarists from Pennsylvania
Storm & Stress members
Battles (band) members
Math rock musicians
21st-century American guitarists
21st-century American male musicians